George Peeples (born October 30, 1943) is an American former professional basketball player.

A 6'7" forward/center, Peeples played at the University of Iowa during the 1960s. He twice led the Iowa Hawkeyes in rebounds, grabbing 10.4 per game in 1964–65, and 10.8 per game in 1965–66. After his college playing days were over, Peeples was drafted in 1966 on the 4th round (35th overall pick) by the Baltimore Bullets, but he never played in the NBA.

From 1967 to 1973, Peeples played professionally in the American Basketball Association as a member of the Indiana Pacers, Carolina Cougars, and Dallas Chaparrals. He averaged 8.1 points per game and 7.3 rebounds per game over his ABA career.

References

1943 births
Living people
American men's basketball players
Baltimore Bullets (1963–1973) draft picks
Basketball players from Georgia (U.S. state)
Carolina Cougars players
Centers (basketball)
Dallas Chaparrals players
Indiana Pacers players
Iowa Hawkeyes men's basketball players
Place of birth missing (living people)